The 1999 UCI Mountain Bike World Championships were the 10th edition of the UCI Mountain Bike World Championships and were held in Åre in the North of Sweden. The events included were cross-country and downhill.

The 1999 UCI Mountain Bike World Championships were the first to include the cross-country team relay. The Spanish team won the inaugural world title in the discipline.

Nicolas Vouilloz won his fifth consecutive world title in the elite men's downhill. Anne-Caroline Chausson won her fourth consecutive world title in the elite women's downhill.

Medal summary

Men's events

Women's events

Team events

Medal table

See also
1999 UCI Mountain Bike World Cup

References

External links
Schedule and coverage of the 1999 UCI MTB World Championships

 
UCI Mountain Bike World Championships
International cycle races hosted by Sweden
UCI Mountain Bike World Championships
UCI Mountain Bike World Championships
Sport in Åre